Midnight Ballad for Ghost Theater (lit. Three-way Intersection Theater; aka The Ghost Theater) is a 2006 South Korean musical fantasy comedy horror film written and directed by Jeon Kye-soo.

Plot 
The plot follows a young girl, Seong So-dan as she searches for her grandmother, who disappears at the beginning of the film after announcing that she wanted to go and see "her film". So-dan goes to the movie theatre to look for her and stops the suicidal manager from hanging himself, he gives her a job working in the box office so she can wait and see if her grandmother will show up. One night, while she is working late at the theater, four ghosts appear to her; Wanda, a bulimic ex-kisaeng who obsessively counts her own hair; Elisa, a Joseon Dynasty princess; Ijawa Hiroshi, a Japanese soldier stationed in Korea and Mosquito. Each of the ghosts is identical to a member of the theater staff working during the day.

So-dan overcomes her fear of the ghosts and joins them as they perform in the theatre at night. She eventually discovers that they were part of an acting troupe, which also included her grandmother and the manager. The four of them were killed at the premier of their debut film "Minosoo: The Bull-headed Man" and have decided to haunt the theatre until the film is shown again.

Cast 
 Kim Kkot-bi as Seong So-dan
 Chun Ho-jin as Woo Ki-nam
 Park Joon-myeon as Elisa
 Jo Hee-bong as Hiroshi
 Park Yeong-soo as Mosquito
 Han Ae-ri as Wanda

Reception 
Although the film performed only moderately at the box office and had only a limited DVD release, it is gaining reputation as a cult film and has been compared to the work of Tim Burton and to The Rocky Horror Picture Show thanks to its surreal edge.

References

External links 
 
 
 
 
 

2006 horror films
2006 fantasy films
2000s comedy horror films
South Korean independent films
South Korean musical films
Musical fantasy films
2000s musical comedy films
South Korean fantasy comedy films
Dark fantasy films
South Korean ghost films
Films about theatre
Films directed by Jeon Kye-soo
2000s Korean-language films
2006 films
2006 comedy films
2000s South Korean films